Bonou  is a town, arrondissement, and commune in the Ouémé Department of south-eastern Benin. The commune covers an area of 275 square kilometres and as of 2002 had a population of 29,656 people.

References

Communes of Benin
Arrondissements of Benin
Populated places in the Ouémé Department